This is a list of quasiparticles.

References

Quasiparticles
Physics-related lists

it:Quasiparticella#Lista delle quasiparticelle